Kroonia natalica is a moth in the family Cossidae. It is found in Kenya, Malawi, South Africa, Tanzania and Zimbabwe.

References

Natural History Museum Lepidoptera generic names catalog

Metarbelinae
Moths described in 1910